Paraliobacillus sediminis is a Gram-positive, slightly halophilic, facultatively anaerobic, endospore-forming and motile bacterium from the genus of Paraliobacillus which has been isolated from sea sediments from the East China Sea.

References

External links
Type strain of Paraliobacillus sediminis at BacDive -  the Bacterial Diversity Metadatabase

Bacillaceae
Bacteria described in 2017